Lawhead is a Scottish surname. Notable people with the surname include: 

 Nathalie Lawhead, American artist and game designer
 Stephen R. Lawhead (born 1950), American writer
 William F. Lawhead, American philosophy professor

English-language surnames
Scottish surnames